The Computer Journal is a peer-reviewed  scientific journal covering computer science and information systems. Established in 1958, it is one of the oldest computer science research journals. It is published by Oxford University Press on behalf of BCS, The Chartered Institute for IT. The authors of the best paper in each annual volume receive the Wilkes Award from BCS, The Chartered Institute for IT.

Editors-in-chief
The following people have been editor-in-chief:

 1958–1969 Eric N. Mutch
 1969–1992 Peter Hammersley
 1993–2000 C. J. van Rijsbergen
 2000–2008 Fionn Murtagh
 2008–2012 Erol Gelenbe
 2012–2016 Fionn Murtagh
 2016–2020 Steve Furber
 2021–present Tom Crick

References

External links
 Official website
 History of the journal
 Wilkes Award

British Computer Society
Computer science in the United Kingdom
Computer science journals
English-language journals
Oxford University Press academic journals
Publications established in 1958
1958 establishments in England
Academic journals associated with learned and professional societies
8 times per year journals